Rajendra Madhavrao Shende (born 13 July 1949), an alumnus of Indian Institute of Technology (IIT) and former Director in United Nations Environment Programme (UNEP), is currently serving as the Chairman of TERRE Policy Centre which is a not-for-profit organization engaged in the policy development and project based advocacy on the sustainable development. Before August 2011, he was the Head of the OzonAction Branch of the United Nations Environment Programme, Division of the Technology, Industry and Economics (UNEP DTIE) in Paris.

He served as Review Editor for the IPCC Special report on Technology Transfer in 2000 and was a Coordinating Lead Author for the IPCC/TEAP special report on Safeguarding the Ozone layer and Global Climate System in 2005. The work of the IPCC, including the contributions of many scientists, was recognised by the joint award of the 2007 Nobel Peace Prize.

His UNEP programme became the first in the United Nations to bag an award from the United States Environmental Protection Agency (EPA) for global efforts to protect the ozone layer. He also won a United States EPA award for Climate Protection.

In 2006 he was felicitated by President of India Dr. Abdul Kalam for his role in development of the solar vaccine cooler for the poor, rural and remote communities.
	
He is a member steering committee of key UNEP reports on interlinkages between Ozone Layer Protection and climate change. He has adopted his village Rahimatpur to develop it into a role model and a Social Laboratory for the sustainable development.

Background and early life 

Rajendra Shende was born and educated in Rahimatpur, a small rural and agricultural town in Satara district of India. He came to Mumbai in 1964 for his college education and succeeded in getting admission, through highly competitive entrance examination, in the Indian Institute of Technology from where he was awarded graduate degree in Chemical Engineering in 1972. Before being selected for international civil service in United Nations, he served in the Indian private sector and the government companies that included Tata Chemicals and SRF in their production, projects and strategic diversification units. After his retirement from UN, Shende spends his time in India and France where he lives in his town Rahimatpur, Pune and Paris. Shende is strong believer in practicing what one preaches.

Career 

Shende after his Chemical Engineering from IIT, began his career with Tata Chemicals, Mithapur, India as Production Engineer in the chemical complex manufacturing chemicals from Sea water. In 1978 he joined Hindustan Organic Chemicals, a Government of India Undertaking which was engaged in the manufacture of Organic Chemicals. He led the project team to set up the first ever Polytetrafluroethylene (PTFE) manufacturing facility in India. In 1988 he was nominated by the Government of India on the National Task Force to carve out India's strategy leading towards its ratification of the Montreal Protocol. Later, he was part of the India's international negotiating team for establishing the financial mechanism for the implementation of the Multilateral Fund for the implementation of Montreal Protocol on the substances that deplete the Ozone Layer. In that capacity he attended most of the negotiations and the international UN meetings on the Montreal Protocol from 1989. In 1992, he was selected to lead the OzonAction Programme of United Nations Environment Programme to enable 146 developing countries to comply with the Montreal Protocol. In year 2010, all the developing countries successfully phased out Chloroflurocarbons (CFCs) and other Ozone Depleting Substances, making Montreal Protocol as ‘one of the most successful international agreement so far’ as per former United Nations Secretary General Kofi Annan.

Career at the United Nations Environment Programme 

As Programme leader in UNEP, he set up the systems for the global cooperation and networking among the developing countries and countries with economies in transition as well as between the developed and developing countries. He pioneered new approaches within his programme to mainstream small countries in the implementation of the Global Environmental Accords and developed instruments to build the capacity for the technology transfer and technology cooperation.

In 1999 he was elevated as Chief of Energy and OzonAction Unit, when he initiated for the first time in the UNEP Division of Technology, Industry and Economics, he initiated the Energy and Climate Programme. He organized workshops on Clean Development Mechanism in more than 20 countries under the Kyoto Protocol. In 2004 he was appointed to become the Head of the expanded OzonAction Branch, to lead the 11 regional and sub-regional networks of 146 National Ozone officers from as many developing countries from UNEP's 5 offices in Bangkok, Bahrain, Nairobi, Paris, Panama city for the global programme for safeguarding the ozone layer and the climate system to get climate mitigation benefits as well as ozone layer protection from the implementation of the Montreal Protocol.

His main achievements in UNEP include the innovative mechanisms of South-South cooperation, regional networking of National Ozone Officers, participatory process for developing country strategy for implementation of the Montreal Protocol, decentralized information clearinghouse, training for the customs officers to prevent environmentally sensitive illegal trade, developing refrigerant management plans and terminal phase out management plans which. These approaches became models for the implementation of other MEAs. Leveraging the Synergies between MEAs through very practical examples has been his major contribution to the coherent and coordinated governance of the environmental issues.

Developing the partnerships with the industries, international organizations, academia and NGOs has been his forte. Moreover, he was instrumental in developing the bilateral cooperation with large number of developed countries to assist the developing countries for the ozone layer protection and safe guarding climate. The innovative partnerships include Green Customs Initiative, Solar Chill Partnership.

Recognition 

 In May 2005, the OzonAction programme became first Programme in the UN system to win the award from United States Environment Protection Agency-EPA for its work on the protection of the Ozone Layer, as well as a special certificate from the President of Senegal on behalf of all African countries. The programme also received the ‘Implementation Agency’ award in 2007.
 Shende received 20th Anniversary Montreal Protocol award for the ‘Outstanding Contribution’ in 2007. 
 The SolarChill vaccine cooler, supported by him, won UK Industry award in 2006.
 In April 2009, he won the Climate Protection award from United States EPA for his work in achieving climate benefits from the actions to protect the ozone layer.
 In March 2010 he was honored, on the occasion of golden jubilee year of State of Maharashtra, India with the Y.B Chavan Award of the Excellence in Environment, which is the highest honor at State level in India.
 In September, 2010, one hundred and ninety-seven countries unanimously approved India's nomination of Rajendra Shende as a senior expert to the United Nations Environment Programme's Technology and Economic Assessment Panel of the Montreal Protocol—the most successful global treaty aimed at protecting the ozone layer.Shende, a former UN diplomat on global environmental treaties and presently chairman of the TERRE Policy Centre, was seconded by the US, Brazil, Kyrgyzstan, Georgia, Kazakhstan, Turkmenistan, Tajikistan, Moldova, Tajikistan, and Turkmenistan. "The universal approval of Shende by the countries, that included China and Pakistan, is considered a welcome development for India and its leadership role under climate change," a statement said.
 In November 2010 he was awarded the certificate of the appreciation for assisting the African countries from Minister of Uganda on behalf of 53 African countries.
 In May 2011, the Refrigerants, Naturally! partnership which is supported by UNEP and funded by European Union  received the Roy Family Award at Harvard University's John F. Kennedy School of Government.
 In 2011 he was awarded "Satara Bhushan" (the highest honour at Satara District level).
 In 2012 he was awarded ‘Rahimatpur Gaurav ‘award , highest honor at town level of Rahimatpur.
Unanimously elected as Senior Expert on UNEP TEAP - United Nations Environment Programmes Technology and Economic Assessment Panel of the Montreal Protocol -- the most successful global treaty aimed at protecting the ozone layer.
Has been one of the Authors of Media India France. Media India Group is a global platform founded in 2004, based in Europe and India, encompassing publishing, communication, consultation services and event management.
Appointed as Honorary Chairman of the International Advisory Council of the Operation Earth. ‘Operation Earth’ is a China-based civil society organisation dedicated to biodiversity conservation and global climate change.
In April 2018 he was appointed as advisor to CBCGDF, China on various environmental matters. CBCGDF is a leading nationwide non-profit public foundation and a social legal entity dedicated to biodiversity conservation and green development.
He has been working as Advisor to International Youth Committee which is an International Youth Organization working to provide a policy framework and practical guidelines for national action and international support to improve the situation of young people around the world.
Appointed on MIT WPU Governing body.

Other projects 

Rajendra Shende also has a website, in which he explains what he likes to call his journey, which “was from the stark rural area in India to the bursting cities of India, from very peculiar local Marathi language to Imperial English to stylish French, from the business and industry to United Nations, from the causes of the problems to the tenets of the solutions, from making of chemicals to phase out of those lingering and persistent man made pollutants.”

He has written numerous articles for the international magazines and is very active on social media, being one of the first UN officials to write blogs on UNEP's official web site and developed the UNEP OzonAction Programme's Social Media Strategy for compliance with the multilateral environmental agreements. His blogs on his current activities and insights are picked up for the publications elsewhere. More generally he believes in thought-sharing, and is following closely the evolution of Social Media. He has personal Facebook profile and a Facebook page, as also an instagram and a twitter handle

References

External links 
 Rajendra Shende's website
 Terre Policy Center's website
Rajendra Shende's Personal Blog
Memorial Trust of Father

United Nations Environment Programme
Living people
Indian chemical engineers
1949 births
People from Satara district
Scientists from Maharashtra
20th-century Indian chemists